Irina Aleksandrovna Meleshina-Simagina (born 25 May 1982, in Ryazan) is a Russian long jumper.

Simagina won the silver medal at the 2004 Summer Olympics. She was then more or less away from the international scene the next two seasons. She did not start at the 2005 World Championships, despite having entered the competition, and gave birth to a daughter in the summer of 2006. She returned to competition in early 2007.

Her personal best jump is 7.27 metres, achieved in July 2004 in Tula.

Performance Enhancement Drug Use
On April 24, 2012, The Russian athletics federation sanctioned Meleshina with a 2-year ban from competition retroacted to Feb. 21, 2012, following a positive drug test in February of the same year. Thus, eliminating her bid for the 2012 Olympic Summer Games in London.

Achievements

References

External links

1982 births
Living people
Doping cases in athletics
Russian female long jumpers
Russian sportspeople in doping cases
Athletes (track and field) at the 2004 Summer Olympics
Olympic athletes of Russia
Olympic silver medalists for Russia
Sportspeople from Ryazan
Medalists at the 2004 Summer Olympics
Olympic silver medalists in athletics (track and field)
Universiade medalists in athletics (track and field)
Universiade gold medalists for Russia